Kangpokpi (Vidhan Sabha constituency) is one of the 60 Vidhan Sabha constituencies in the Indian state of Manipur.

Members of Assembly 
 1974: Kishore Thapa, Indian National Congress
 1980: Kishore Thapa, Indian National Congress
 1984: Kishore Thapa, Indian National Congress
 1990: L. S. John, Janata Dal
 1995: Thangminlen, Manipur People's Party
 2000: Thangminlien Kipgen, Nationalist Congress Party
 2002: Thangminlien, Federal Party of Manipur
 2007: Thangminlen Kipgen, Naga National Party
 2012: Nemcha Kipgen, Indian National Congress

Elections results

2017

See also
 Kangpokpi
 List of constituencies of Manipur Legislative Assembly
 Senapati district

References

External links
 

Senapati district
Assembly constituencies of Manipur